The Urenui River is a river of the Taranaki Region of New Zealand's North Island. It flows northeast before turning northwest to reach the coast at Urenui.

See also
List of rivers of New Zealand

References

Rivers of Taranaki
Rivers of New Zealand